Jean-François Soucasse (born 1 August 1972), is a French former footballer.

Club career
Born in Toulouse, Soucasse started his career with local side Lherm, before joining Muret. He went on to represent a number of clubs in the two top French leagues, including Saint-Étienne, before joining Les Verts in a backroom staff role.

International career
Soucasse represented France at under-21 level on four occasions in 1992.

References

1972 births
Living people
Footballers from Toulouse
French footballers
France youth international footballers
Association football defenders
Ligue 1 players
Ligue 2 players
AS Muret players
Toulouse FC players
AS Saint-Étienne players
Canet Roussillon FC players
Nîmes Olympique players